Jana Neubert (born 30 August 1984) is a German sprinter. She competed in the women's 4 × 400 metres relay at the 2004 Summer Olympics.

References

External links
 

1984 births
Living people
Athletes (track and field) at the 2004 Summer Olympics
German female sprinters
Olympic athletes of Germany
Olympic female sprinters
Sportspeople from Chemnitz